Alva Regional Airport  is a city-owned, public-use airport located two nautical miles (4 km) south of the central business district of Alva, a city in Woods County, Oklahoma, United States. It is included in the National Plan of Integrated Airport Systems for 2011–2015, which categorized it as a general aviation facility.

Although most U.S. airports use the same three-letter location identifier for the FAA and IATA, this airport is assigned AVK by the FAA, but has no designation from the IATA (which assigned AVK to Arvaikheer Airport in Arvaikheer, Mongolia).

Facilities and aircraft 
Alva Regional Airport covers an area of 650 acres (263 ha) at an elevation of 1,474 feet (449 m) above mean sea level. It has two runways: 18/36 is 4,999 by 75 feet (1,524 x 23 m) with a concrete surface and 8/26 is 1,300 by 170 foot (396 x 52 m) turf runway.

For the 12-month period ending February 19, 2008, the airport had 6,500 general aviation aircraft operations, an average of 17 per day. At that time there were 51 aircraft based at this airport: 94% single-engine, 4% multi-engine, and 2% helicopter.

References

External links 
 Alva Regional Airport Department at City of Alva website
 Alva Regional Airport (AVK)  at Oklahoma Aeronautics Commission
 Aerial image as of February 1995 from USGS The National Map
 

Airports in Oklahoma
Buildings and structures in Woods County, Oklahoma